Gerta Lehmann (born 21 July 1979) is a Greek former equestrian. She competed in the individual dressage event at the 2004 Summer Olympics.

References

External links
 

1979 births
Living people
Greek female equestrians
Greek dressage riders
Olympic equestrians of Greece
Equestrians at the 2004 Summer Olympics
People from Cagnes-sur-Mer
Sportspeople from Alpes-Maritimes